Who Do I Gotta Kill? (also known as Me & the Mob) is a 1994 comedy film directed and co-written by Frank Rainone with James Lorinz and Rocco Simonelli also writing. The film stars Sandra Bullock, John Costelloe, Steve Buscemi, and James Lorinz.

Plot
A struggling writer takes a job with the mob to make ends meet.

Cast
Sandra Bullock as Lori
Sandy Colosimo as Agency Receptionist 
John Costelloe as Bink-Bink Borelli 
Tony Darrow as Tony Bando
Lori Rachal as Jogger 
Ted Sorel as George Stelloris 
Louis Giovannetti as Dick 
Steve Buscemi
Stephen Lee as Bobby Blitzer 
Suze Trevithick as Girl at George's Bar 
Frank Aquilino as Joey "Clams" Tantillo 
John 'Cha Cha' Ciarcia as Marty "No-Neck" Scalia 
James Lorinz as Jimmy Corona 
Johnny Lorinz as Detective 
Lee Anne Linfante as Tina 
Nicholas Spina as Water Department Inspector 
Victor Triola as Exiting Patron 
Mario Cantone as Rico 
Frankie Cee as Franco 
Richard Bright as Belcher 
Michael Luciano as Leary 
Vickie Weinstein as Publisher's Secretary 
Roy Frumkes as Publisher 
Mary Lynn Hetsko as Nurse 
Nellie Zastawna as Bingo Winner 
Irma St. Paule as Woman with Knitting Needle
Frances Levy as Woman Negotiating 
Arthur J. Nascarella as Distraught Wiseguy 
Vincent Pastore as Birdman Badamo

See also
1994 in film

References

External links

1992 films
Mafia comedy films
1990s crime comedy films
1992 comedy films
1990s American films